The Pacific Air Forces Regional Support Center, formerly the 611th Air Support Group,  is a United States Air Force unit. It is assigned to the Eleventh Air Force, stationed at Joint Base Elmendorf-Richardson, Alaska.

The center is responsible for the program management, operation, and quality assurance of the Alaska Radar System, consisting of 17 long-range and 3 short-range radar sites; the forward operation locations at Galena Airport, King Salmon Airport, and Eareckson Air Station; project management for future radar and communications systems; and logistics staff for 11th Air Force and the Alaska NORAD Region.

From October 1, 2010, the 611th Air Support Group added eight tropical locations in the Pacific to the sites it managed around Alaska. Due to the creation of Joint Base Pearl Harbor–Hickam, the management and support of Wake Island Airfield and seven other geographically separated locations were moved from the 15th Wing at JBPHH to the 611th ASG at Joint Base Elmendorf-Richardson.

Units
The group consists of two squadrons and two flights and provides surveillance radars, Arctic infrastructure including airfields, communications and USAF airmen for homeland defense, decisive force projection, and aerospace command and control in Alaska. The Pacific Air Forces Regional Support Center is part of the Eleventh Air Force.

 The 611th Air Support Squadron (611 ASUS) manages three of PACAF's largest operations and maintenance (O&M) contracts worth $82M for Eareckson Air Station, the FOL at King Salmon airport, 15 remote radar sites (including the King Salmon Long Range Radar Site nearby King Salmon airport) and three radio relay stations. The squadron provides/directs quality assurance for logistics, force protection, services, communications and facility engineering efforts at these 19 remote locations.
 The 611th Air Communications Squadron (611 ACOMS) serves as the focal point for all command, control, communications, and computers (C4) support for ANR and 11 AF. Key functions include theater long-haul communications, radar systems communications, circuit management, network operations and configuration control. Additionally, the unit performs Meteorological Navigational (METNAV) certifications for airfields throughout the theater, as well as Defense Red Switch Network, Communications Security (COMSEC) and frequency spectrum management support. In addition to providing communications planning and programming support to the three O&M contracts, the 611 ACOMS also manages $22 million in communications requirements. The 611 ACOMS also provides direct communications support to the 611 AOC – 24/7 battle staff crisis action operation center.
 The 611th Civil Engineer Squadron (611 CES) provides engineer service functions at all 40 (active and inactive) sites throughout Alaska. The 611 CES assures environmental compliance within  of military operations air space and provides, as a command resource, specialized capability in aircraft hangar door maintenance and repair; asbestos and lead abatement; depot overhaul and certification of emergency power engine-generator sets and aircraft arresting systems; construction of Super K-Span facilities; as well as crane and hoist repair and certification. The 611 CES provides facility support to the three O&M contracts and also manages $61.8M in facility requirements.
 The Missile Defense Flight or Command Representative for Missile Defense serves as the focal point for all issues related to Ground-based Midcourse Defense in Alaska, in support of Alaska Command, Alaska NORAD Region, and 11 AF.
 The 11 AF/Alaska NORAD Region (ANR) Logistics Flight provides a core group of logisticians to support Air Force and NORAD air operations throughout the theater, including manning the ANR Battlestaff and establishing logistics readiness centers when necessary.

Alaska Radar System
 see also: Joint Surveillance System

Radar sites

 Barter Island Long Range Radar Site
 Cape Lisburne Long Range Radar Site
 Cape Newenham Long Range Radar Site
 Cape Romanzof Long Range Radar Site
 Cold Bay Long Range Radar Site
 Fort Yukon Long Range Radar Site
 Indian Mountain Long Range Radar Site
 King Salmon Long Range Radar Site
 Kotzebue Long Range Radar Site
 Murphy Dome Long Range Radar Site

 Oliktok Long Range Radar Site
 Point Barrow Long Range Radar Site
 Point Lay Long Range Radar Site
 Sparrevohn Long Range Radar Site
 Tatalina Long Range Radar Site
 Tin City Long Range Radar Site
 Bullen Point Short Range Radar Site
 Point Lonely Short Range Radar Site
 Wainwright Short Range Radar Site

Military support airports
 Barter Island LRRS Airport 
 Cape Lisburne LRRS Airport 
 Cape Newenham LRRS Airport 
 Cape Romanzof LRRS Airport 
 Indian Mountain LRRS Airport 
 Point Lay LRRS Airport 
 Sparrevohn LRRS Airport 
 Tatalina LRRS Airport 
 Tin City LRRS Airport 
 Wake Island Airfield

References

 

 11th Air Force Factsheet

Centers of the United States Air Force
Logistics units and formations of the United States Air Force
Military units and formations in Alaska
Radar networks
Military units and formations established in 2013